This is a list of episodes of the British science-fiction television series Captain Scarlet and the Mysterons, filmed by Gerry and Sylvia Anderson's production company Century 21 for distribution by ITC Entertainment. The series ran for 32 episodes and was first broadcast between 1967 and 1968 on the Associated Television network.

Main series (1967–68)
All episodes are of 25 minutes duration. Episodes are listed in the official order published by ITC. Air dates are the original broadcast dates in the ATV Midlands area unless otherwise stated.

Audio episodes
In 1967, Century 21 released an additional five Captain Scarlet adventures as 7-inch vinyl EP records (promoted as "mini-albums").

Compilation films
Two compilation films, each comprising re-edited versions of four of the TV episodes, were released in the early 1980s.

CGI test film
The 2005 CGI reboot series, Gerry Anderson's New Captain Scarlet, was preceded by a short test film titled Captain Scarlet and the Return of the Mysterons, which had two private screenings (in 2000 and 2001).

References

Works cited

External links

List of Captain Scarlet and the Mysterons episodes at Fanderson.org.uk

"The Secretive Bus and the Mysterons": a tongue-in-cheek episode guide at TheVervoid.com

 
Episodes
Lists of British science fiction television series episodes